Satyalapadu is a village and gram panchayat located in the mandal of Gampalagudem in the Krishna District of Andhra Pradesh, India. Historically, and even now, this village is primarily home for farming community and farmers here are well versed with cultivating crops like paddy, cotton, chili pepper, peanut, subaabul and various daal (split peas).

Government schools

There are two government schools in the village:
An Elementary school (pp to 5th): which is located in the center of the village.
High school (6th to 10th) : which is located on the west side bank of Chaviti Waagu (small stream which is used for washing clothes daily).

Temples
There are two main temples in the village:
Veera Brahmendra swami temple which is located at outside of the village which is nearest to Chaviti Waagu.

References

External links
Reports of National Panchayat Directory
Department of School education list of Gampalagudem mandal
Villages in Gampalagudem mandal
gampalagudem on wiki
krishna dist pincode list

Villages in Krishna district